In mathematics, the Mehler–Fock transform is an integral transform introduced  by  and rediscovered by .

It is given by 

where P is a Legendre function of the first kind.

Under appropriate conditions, the following inversion formula holds:

References

Integral transforms